Hubbard is a village in the Canadian province of Saskatchewan within the Rural Municipality of Ituna Bon Accord No. 246 and Census Division No. 10.

History 
Hubbard incorporated as a village on June 11, 1910.

Demographics 

See also 

 List of communities in Saskatchewan
 Villages of Saskatchewan

References

Villages in Saskatchewan
Ituna Bon Accord No. 246, Saskatchewan
Division No. 10, Saskatchewan